Təklə Mirzəbaba (also, Teklya Mirzababa) is a village and municipality in the Gobustan Rayon of Azerbaijan. According to the 2009 census, it has a population of 2,038.

References 

Populated places in Gobustan District